Marion Bartoli was the defending champion; however, she didn't take part in these championships this year.Anastasia Pavlyuchenkova won her first WTA singles title, defeating Daniela Hantuchová in the final 1–6, 6–1, 6–0.

Seeds

Draw

Finals

Top half

Bottom half

External links
 Main Draw
 Qualifying Draw

Monterrey Open
Monterrey Open - Singles